The Three Women of Urban Hell is a 1928 German silent film directed by Jaap Speyer and starring Mona Maris, Fred Doederlein, and Hilde Maroff. It was shot at the Marienfelde Studios of Terra Film in Berlin. The film's art direction was by Hans Jacoby.

Cast

See also
 Lake of Ladies (1934)

References

Bibliography

External links

1928 films
Films of the Weimar Republic
Films directed by Jaap Speyer
German silent feature films
Films based on Austrian novels
German black-and-white films
Terra Film films
Films shot at Terra Studios